Christianity in Kazakhstan is the second most practiced religion after Islam. There are 4,214,232 Christians in Kazakhstan (according to the 2009 census). The majority of Christian citizens are Russians, Ukrainians and Belarusians, who belong to the Eastern Orthodox Church in Kazakhstan under the Moscow Patriarchate. About 1.5 percent of the population is ethnically German, most of whom are Catholic or Lutheran. There are also many Presbyterians, Jehovah's Witnesses, Seventh-day Adventists and Pentecostals. Methodists, Mennonites, and Mormons have also registered churches with the government.

There are more Protestant congregations - 93 "nontraditional" Protestant Christian churches registered with the Kazakh government from 2006 to 2007. There are 83 Catholic church buildings in Kazakhstan. According to a 2009 national census, 26% of Kazakhstan's population is Christian. There are two Baptist organizations in Kazakhstan: the Council of Churches of Evangelical Christians and Baptists, with 1,000 members, and the Baptist Union of Kazakhstan, with 10,000 members. 198 churches affiliated with the Baptist Union are registered with the government.

Demographics

According to the 2009 Census, there were 4,214,232 Christians in Kazakhstan. Their ethnic affiliation is as follows:

Russians - 3,476,748 (91.6% of the ethnic Russians)
Ukrainians - 302,199 (90.7% of Ukrainians)
Germans - 145,556 (81.6%)
Belarusians - 59,936 (90.2%)
Koreans - 49,543 (49.4%)
Kazakhs - 39,172 (0.4%)
Polish - 30,675 (90.1%)
Tatars - 20,913 (10.2%)
Azeris - 2,139 (2.5%)
Uzbeks - 1,794 (0.4%)
Uighurs - 1,142 (0.5%)
Chechens - 940 (3.0%)
Tajiks - 331 (0.9%)
Turkish - 290 (0.3%)
Kyrgyz - 206 (0.9%)
Kurds - 203 (0.5%)
Dungan - 191 (0.4%)
Other minorities - 82,254 (52.3%)

History 

Before the conquest of Genghis Khan there used to be a minority of Nestorians in the Kazakh region.

By the time Kazakhstan was conquered by Genghis Khan, most of the Naimans were Christians. They remained so after the Mongol conquest and were among the second wave of Christians to enter China with Kublai Khan. Meanwhile, the Naimans who settled in the Western Khanates of the Mongol Empire were all eventually converted to Islam.

Converts to Christianity
A 2015 study estimates that some 50,000 Christians from a Muslim background reside in the country.

See also
Religion in Kazakhstan
Catholicism in Kazakhstan
Eastern Orthodoxy in Kazakhstan
Union of Evangelical Christian Baptists of Kazakhstan

References

External links
Map of Catholic Churches in Kazakhstan
Pope John Paul the Second visits Kazakhstan